Luis Diego Sáenz Carazo  (June 21, 1836, Cartago, Costa Rica – April 8, 1895, San José) was a Costa Rican politician.
 Sáenz Carazo was member of the Constituent assembly of 1871.

References

Vice presidents of Costa Rica
1836 births
1895 deaths
People from Cartago Province
Government ministers of Costa Rica
Costa Rican diplomats
Foreign ministers of Costa Rica